Andrei Mercea (16 March 1925 – 24 January 2002) was a Romanian football forward.

Club career
Andrei Mercea was born on 16 March 1925 in Arad, Romania and started playing football at junior level at local clubs SG Arad and Gloria Arad. He started his senior career, making his Divizia A debut on 15 September 1946 for ITA Arad in a 8–4 victory against Dermagarand Târgu Mureș. He won the title with ITA in the first two seasons of his career, at the first contributing with 12 goals scored in 22 appearances and in the second he played 21 games and scored 5 goals, also winning a Cupa României. In 1948 he went to play for CSCA București where on 21 November 1948 he appeared in the first ever CSCA București – Dinamo București derby which ended with a 1–0 loss. After one season, Mercea returned in Arad, winning another two Divizia A titles with UTA Arad, at the first he made 22 appearances in which he scored 12 goals and in the second he played 24 matches and scored one goal and he also won the 1953 Cupa României. He made his last Divizia A appearance on 15 June 1958, playing for the Old Lady in a 2–1 victory against Rapid București, gaining a total of 230 matches played with 57 goals scored in the competition. Andrei Mercea spent the last years of his career playing for AMEF Arad and Teba Arad in the lower leagues of Romania. He died on 24 January 2002 and a book about him was written by Radu Romănescu, called Andrei Mercea – Campionul care desena inimi (Andrei Mercea – The champion that drew hearts), being released on 18 April 2018.

International career
Andrei Mercea played 6 matches and scored two goals for Romania's national team, making his debut on 6 June 1948 under coach Petre Steinbach in a 9–0 loss against Hungary at the 1948 Balkan Cup, a competition in which he would make two more appearances. His last three matches for the national team were friendlies in which he scored two goals against Albania and Poland, making his last appearance on 25 May 1952 in a 1–0 victory against Poland. He was part of Romania's squad at the 1952 Summer Olympics.

International goals
Scores and results list Romania's goal tally first, score column indicates score after each Mercea goal.

Honours
UTA Arad
Divizia A: 1946–47, 1947–48, 1950, 1954
Cupa României: 1947–48, 1953

Notes

References

External links

Andrei Mercea at Labtof.ro

1925 births
2002 deaths
Romanian footballers
Romania international footballers
Association football forwards
Olympic footballers of Romania
Footballers at the 1952 Summer Olympics
Liga I players
Liga II players
FC UTA Arad players
FC Steaua București players
Vagonul Arad players
Sportspeople from Arad, Romania